Najima is the feminine of the Arabic name Najim. It may refer to:

Places
Najima Castle, a hilltop castle in Fukuoka City, Fukuoka Prefecture, Japan
Najima Station, a railway station in Higashi-ku, Fukuoka, Japan
Najafabad, Zarandieh, a village in Hakimabad Rural District, Zarandieh County, Markazi Province, Iran

People
Najima Parveen (born 1990), Pakistani sprinter
Najima Rhozali (born 1960), Moroccan politician

See also
Najma (disambiguation)
Najim (disambiguation)